Henri Cueco (19 October 1929 – 13 March 2017) was a French painter, essayist, novelist and radio personality. As a self-taught painter, his work was exhibited internationally. He was the author of several books, including collections of essays and novels. He was also a contributor to France Culture. A communist-turned-libertarian, he was a co-founder of Coopérative des Malassis, an anti-consumerist artists' collective. He was best known for The Red Men, a series of figurative paintings depicting aspects of the Cold War like the May 1968 events, the Vietnam War and Red Scare, and his 150 still lifes, or "portraits," of potatoes.

Early life
Henri Cueco was born on 19 October 1929 in Uzerche, Corrèze, a rural part of France. His father, Vicente Cueco, was an immigrant from Spain. His mother was French. He was essentially self-taught, though his father also taught him how to paint from the age of 13.

Career
Cueco began his career as a landscape painter in the 1950s. His artwork was political, and he was a critic of materialism and minimalism. He did paintings of hunting dogs and snakes, followed by 150 still lifes, or "portraits," of potatoes.

In 1969–1970, Cueco co-founded an artists collective called Coopérative des Malassis with Lucien Fleury, Jean-Claude Latil, Michel Parré and Gérard Tisserand. Together, they designed a politically satirical fresco called Le Grand Méchoui in 1972. They designed Qui tue ? ou l’affaire Gabrielle Russier in 1973. They also designed Radeau de la Méduse ou la Dérive de la société, a decor on consumerism in the Grand'Place, Grenoble, in 1973–1975. They designed Les affaires reprennent in 1977.

His work was first exhibited at the Salon de la Jeune peinture, followed by the Atelier populaire. In 1970, he exhibited The Red Men, a series of paintings on the Cold War (including the May 1968 events, the Vietnam War and the Red Scare), at the Musée d'Art Moderne de la Ville de Paris. In 1986, when he exhibited an irreverent portrait of Karl Marx, Sigmund Freud and Mao Zedong in Beijing, China, he was asked to take it down. The painting included the following quotation by Henri Jeanson: "Capitalism is the exploitation of men by men. Communism? It is the opposite."

In 1997, Cueco exhibited paintings inspired by Nicolas Poussin and Philippe de Champaigne at the Centre d'art contemporain in Meymac. In 2010, he exhibited nudes in the manner of Ingres at the Musée Ingres in Montauban. He exhibited his work at the Musée d'art et d'archéologie du Périgord in 2014, when he was the guest of honour at the Expoésie Festival. His last exhibition was held at La Maison Rouge in February 2017.

Cueco was the founder of the Association Pays Paysage in Uzerche. He was a contributor to the French radio station France Culture, especially its programmes called Les Papous dans la tête and Les Décraqués. He was the author of several books, including novels and collections of essays. One of his novels was made into a 2007 film directed by Jean Becker, Conversations with My Gardener.

Cueco was an avid reader of Marxist texts. He was member of the French Communist Party from 1956 to 1976. He also joined the General Confederation of Labour (CGT), one of the main labour unions in France. With Ernest Pignon-Ernest, he co-founded the Syndicat national des artistes plasticiens CGT in 1977. However, by the 1980s, he had become a libertarian.

Personal life and death
Cueco had a wife, and a son, a professional zarb player. He resided between Vigeois in his native Corrèze and Paris.

Cueco died of a kidney infection but was weakened by Alzheimer's disease on 13 March 2017 in Paris. He was 87.

Works

References

1929 births
2017 deaths
French people of Spanish descent
People from Corrèze
Painters from Paris
French male painters
20th-century French painters
20th-century French male artists
21st-century French painters
21st-century French male artists
20th-century French essayists
21st-century French essayists
French male novelists
20th-century French novelists
20th-century French male writers
21st-century French novelists
French radio presenters
French Communist Party members
Members of the General Confederation of Labour (France)
Deaths from dementia in France
Deaths from Alzheimer's disease